Charles Ellis (1815 — date of death unknown) was an English first-class cricketer.

Ellis was educated at Harrow School, where he played for the cricket eleven. He played first-class cricket shortly after finishing his education at Harrow, with three appearances in 1833. Each appearance came for a different team, with his debut coming for an A to K team against an L to Z team. His second match came for the Marylebone Cricket Club against the Gentlemen of Kent, while his third match came for the Gentlemen in the Gentlemen v Players fixture; all of his first-class appearances came at Lord's. Ellis scored 6 runs across these matches, with a highest score of 3.

References

External links

1815 births
Date of death unknown
People educated at Harrow School
English cricketers
A to K v L to Z cricketers
Marylebone Cricket Club cricketers
Gentlemen cricketers